John Collings Willcock (9 August 1879 – 7 June 1956) was the 15th Premier of Western Australia, serving from 1936 until 1945. He was a member of the Australian Labor Party.

Early life
John Willcock was born at Frogmoor (now Frogmore), New South Wales on 9 August 1879. The son of miner Joseph Willcock, he was educated at Sydney Boys High School, before emigrating to Western Australia in 1897. He was employed on the Fremantle Harbour Works until 1899, then spent two years as an engine driver or cleaner for Western Australian Government Railways. In 1902 he moved to Geraldton, where he worked as a railway fireman until 1912. In 1907 he married Sicily Ann Stone, with whom he had three sons and three daughters. From 1912 to 1917 he worked as an engine driver.

Political career
Willcock became an active and enthusiastic member of the Labor Party (ALP), holding various offices in the Geraldton branch of the Engine Drivers', Firemen's and Cleaners' Union, and representing them at Federal conferences. From 1914 to 1917 he was President of the Geraldton District Council of the ALP, and he was a Justice of the Peace from 1915. On 14 April 1917 he contested the Western Australian Legislative Assembly seat of Geraldton in a by-election occasioned by the resignation of Edward Heitmann, but was defeated by Samuel Elliott. Five months later he won the seat in the general election of 29 September 1917. He was soon made a member of the executive of the Australian Workers' Union, and became secretary of the Parliamentary Labor Party.

On 16 April 1924, Willcock was appointed Minister for Railways and Justice and Minister for Police in the Collier ministry. He held the Police portfolio until 25 June 1928, and the Railways and Justice portfolio until the defeat of the Collier government on 23 April 1930. From 1927 to 1930 he was deputy leader of the Parliamentary Labor Party.

When the Labor party returned to power under Collier on 24 April 1933, Willcock resumed as Minister for Railways and Justice, and was also given the Education portfolio. He relinquished the Education portfolio on 26 March 1935, when he was reappointed deputy leader. On 19 August the following year, Collier stepped down as premier and leader of the Labor Party, and the following day Willcock was appointed his successor. Relinquishing the Railways and Justice portfolio, he took the offices of Premier, Treasurer and Minister for Forests. He dropped the Forests portfolio on 9 December 1943, but held the other offices for nearly nine years, resigning for reasons of ill health on 31 July 1945. During his time as Premier of Western Australia, Willcock represented Western Australia at the coronation of King George VI and Queen Elizabeth in May 1937. He was known for his "disarming modesty".

After resigning as premier, Willcock retired to the backbenches until the general election of 15 March 1947, at which he did not re-contest his seat. He died on 7 June 1956 at St John of God Hospital, Subiaco, Western Australia, and was buried in Karrakatta Cemetery.

John Willcock College (opened as John Willcock Senior High School), established in Geraldton in 1975, was named after Willcock until it was renamed Champion Bay Senior High School.

References

1879 births
1956 deaths
Deputy Premiers of Western Australia
Burials at Karrakatta Cemetery
Members of the Western Australian Legislative Assembly
People from New South Wales
Premiers of Western Australia
People from Geraldton
Treasurers of Western Australia
Australian Labor Party members of the Parliament of Western Australia